Lesser, from Eliezer ("Help/Court of my God"), is a surname. Notable people with the surname include:
 Adolf Lesser (1851–1926), German physician
 Aleksander Lesser (1814–1884), Polish painter and art critic
 Anton Lesser (born 1952), British actor
 Axel Lesser (born 1946), East German cross country skier
 Edmund Lesser (1852–1918), German dermatologist
 Erik Lesser (born 1988), German biathlete
 Gabriele Lesser (born 1960), German historian and journalist
 George Lesser, American musician
 Gerald S. Lesser (1926–2010), American psychologist
 Henry Lesser (born 1963), German footballer
 J Lesser (born 1970), American musician
 Len Lesser (1922–2011), American actor
 Louis Lesser (born 1916), American real estate developer
 Matt Lesser, Connecticut politician
 Mike Lesser (born 1943), British mathematical philosopher and political activist
 Milton Lesser or Stephen Marlowe (1928–2008), American author
 Norman Lesser (1902–1985), Anglican bishop and Archbishop of New Zealand
 Otto Lesser (1830–1887), German astronomer
 Rika Lesser (born 1953), American poet
 Robert Lesser (born 1942), American actor
 Rosa Lesser, Austrian luger
 Ryan Lesser, Rhode Island video game designer
 Sam Lesser or Sam Russell (1915–2010), British journalist and Spanish Civil War veteran
 Sol Lesser (1890–1980), American film producer
 Stephen A. Lesser (born 1944), American architect
 Virginia Lesser, American statistician
 Wendy Lesser (born 1952), American author, editor and critic
 Werner Lesser (1932–2005), East German ski jumper

Lesser is also a given name. Notable people with the given name include:
 Lesser Samuels (1894–1980), Hollywood screenwriter
 Lesser Ury (1861-1931), German Impressionist painter and printmaker

See also
 Lessing
 Lessor (disambiguation)